Kalateh-ye Sadu (also Romanized as Kalāteh-ye Şādū, Kalāteh-ye Sādū, and Kalāteh-ye Sādow) is a village in Radkan Rural District, in the Central District of Chenaran County, Razavi Khorasan Province, Iran. At the 2006 census, its population was 98, in 26 families.

References 

Populated places in Chenaran County